Eupatorium camiguinense is a plant species in the family Asteraceae.

References

camiguinense
Taxa named by Elmer Drew Merrill